The Burlington County Special Services School District is a special education public school district headquartered in Westampton, in Burlington County, New Jersey, United States, whose schools offer educational and therapeutic services for students of elementary and high school age from across the county who have emotional of physical disabilities that cannot be addressed by their sending districts.

The Burlington County Special Services School District was established in 1972 by the Burlington County Board of Chosen Commissioners. At first the district served 30 disabled students, but grew within five years to accommodate 500 students from 40 sending school districts in the county. A newly constructed campus for the school was built in Westampton, starting use in January 1983. In 1990, the district opened a high school for at-risk students in Lumberton Township and a K-8 campus was opened the following year in Willingboro Township to help teach students how to overcome their disabilities.

As of the 2019–20 school year, the district, comprised of three schools, had an enrollment of 510 students and 129.5 classroom teachers (on an FTE basis), for a student–teacher ratio of 3.9:1.

History
A group of emotionally and physically disabled students from the school district's marching band participated in the inaugural parade for President Bill Clinton. The band also marched in the parade in Atlantic City, New Jersey for the 1993 Miss America pageant.

Saying that he "didn't even know it was a paying job" when he was elected to the Assembly in 1995, Superintendent Carmine DeSopo announced in 1996 that he would donate his entire $35,000 annual salary from the Assembly to the school district's marching band and to a camp the district operated for adult graduates. Having been responsible for the creation of the district, DeSopo announced in March 2001 that he was retiring at the end of the school year from his position as superintendent after 38 years in the field of education.

Schools
Schools in the district (with 2019–20 enrollment data from the National Center for Education Statistics) are:
Comprehensive program
Main Campus at Westampton with 407 students in grades PreK-12)
Dr. Anthony DeBonis, principal
Transition Campus
Mary Jean Kneringer, principal
Burlington County Alternative High School with 88 students in grades 6-12
Joan Barbagiovanni, principal
Lumberton Campus with 25 students in grades 6-12
Dr. Ashanti Holley, interim principal

Administration
Core members of the district's administration are:
Christopher J. Nagy, Superintendent
Andrew C. Willmott, Business Administrator / Board Secretary

References

External links

School districts in Burlington County, New Jersey
Special schools in the United States
Westampton Township, New Jersey
School districts established in 1972
1972 establishments in New Jersey